Frontier Airport  is located  south of Frontier, Saskatchewan, Canada.

In 2008 the airport received funding to repair the runway surface.

See also 
List of airports in Saskatchewan

References

External links
Page about this airport on COPA's Places to Fly airport directory

Registered aerodromes in Saskatchewan
Frontier No. 19, Saskatchewan